Periya is a small township in Kasaragod District, Kerala State, India.

Periya is a small town located in Hosdurg of Kanhangad in the Kasaragod district, Kerala with total 3100 families residing. The Periya village has population of 14077 of which 6718 are males while 7359 are females as per Population Census 2011.

In Periya the population of children with age 0-6 is 1494 which makes up 10.61% of total population of village. Average Sex Ratio of Periya village is 1095 which is higher than Kerala state average of 1084. Child Sex Ratio for the Periya as per census 2011 is 989, higher than Kerala average of 964.

Location
Periya is located between Kanhangad and Kasaragod on National Highway 66.  The place has grown in prominence because of a large number of new organisations like Central University of Kerala, making Periya their home.

Suburbs and Villages
 Panayal, Thachangad, Chalingal and Kanjiradukkam
 Kundamkuzhy, Poinachi, Periyattadukkam and Kuniya
 Kannamvayal, Thachangad, Mavval and Bangad
 Maruthadukkam, Cherkkala, Thayyil and Chattanchal
 Kuniya, Cherumba, Periyattadukkam, Keloth, Pollakkada and Pullur Village
 Haripuram, Pullur, Moolakandam and Mavungal

Prominent Organizations
Central University of Kerala - Central University of Kerala is one of the 15 new universities constituted by the Government of India in 2009. The university has a 310-acre campus in Periya.
 Navodaya Vidyalaya, Kasaragod - Navodaya Vidyalaya is a model school run by the Government of India.  It is affiliated to CBSE, New Delhi.  Classes are conducted from Grade.VI to Grade XII.  It is an autonomous and fully residential facility.
 Sree Narayana College of Arts and Management Periye.
Ambedkar College of Education, Periye.
Community Health Center Periye (CHC Periye)
GHSS Periye
Government Poly Technic College Periye
 SI-MET Nursing college run by Government of Kerala, Ayampara Periye
 Kerala Armed Police 4 Battalion- Detachment Camp Periye.
 Plantation corporation of Kerala Periye Division.

Transportation
Local roads have access to NH.66 which connects to Mangalore in the north and Calicut in the south. The nearest railway station is Kanhangad on Mangalore-Palakkad line. There are airports at Mangalore and Kannur.

Image gallery

References

Kanhangad area